EXKi [ekski:] is an international chain of fast-casual "grab-and-go" restaurants. The Belgian owners have stated that the name is a play on the French word "exquis", meaning "exquisite" or "delightful".

, EXKi operates 70 restaurants in Belgium, France, Italy, Luxembourg, Netherlands and United States.

History 

The concept for EXKi was developed during a 1999 reunion of three former classmates: Frederic Rouvez, Nicolas Steisel, and Arnaud de Meeûs. Their idea was a fast-casual restaurant where the food was “natural, fresh & ready”.

In January 2001, they opened their first EXKi restaurant in Brussels. In 2002, EXKi won the "Best Concept" award from the French international real estate conference MAPIC, and was awarded their "Best Food and Beverage Retail Concept" award in 2012.

In June 2014, the chain opened their first United States location on Park Avenue South in Manhattan.

References

External links
 Official web site
 Official web site for US location

Restaurant chains in Belgium
2001 establishments in Belgium